Sick Individuals (stylized as SICK INDIVIDUALS) is a Dutch electronic dance music act consisting of Rinze "Ray" Hofstee and Joep "Jim" Smeele. The two met in Hilversum, Netherlands (2008) while studying Music Composition. Jim and Ray had been composing for television commercials until their mutual fascination for both classical and modern music inspired their business partnership in 2010, when Sick Individuals was born.

Early in their careers, groups including Daft Punk, Bingo Players and the Swedish House Mafia influenced the duo. 
They have also produced with Axwell on the song "I Am", and with Dannic on "Blueprint" (both reached number one on Beatport) as well as remixing songs by Rihanna, Avicii, Icona Pop, Tiesto, Flo Rida and David Guetta. Their remix of Icona Pop – "I Love It" received a high level of support and recognition in the dance music industry.

Discography

Singles

Remixes 
 The Chainsmokers - Kills You Slowly
 Beverly - I Need Your Love
 Rita Ora - Your Song
 Kev - Moments
 Moby - Porcelain
 Dazepark - Rift
 Madonna - Bitch I'm Madonna
 Avicii – Addicted To You 
 Flo Rida – How I Feel 
 Jerome Isma-Ae – Hold That Sucker Down
 Timeflies – I Choose U
 Rihanna and David Guetta – Right Now
 Savoy – We Are The Sun
 Roberto Da Costa featuring Daphne Koo – Excited
 Dave Aude featuring Irina – One Last Kiss
 Hook N Sling and Nervo – Reason
 Someday – You're in my Head
 Icona Pop – I Love It
 Qulinez – Troll 
 Korr A – Firecracka
 Lost Witness – Our Suns Rising
 Nelly Furtado – Spirit Indestructible
 Kevin Scott – Junp All Night
 Marco V – GOHF
 Nelly Furtado – Big Hoops 
 Nire Alldai – Hella Bad
 Conor Mayard – Vegas Girl 
 Jenny Andrews – Unhappy Ending
 DJ Pauly D – Night of My Life
 Alex Sayz and Nadia Ali – Free To Go
 Justin Bieber featuring Far East Movement – Live My Life
 Victoria Aitken – Weekend Lover 
 DJ Jean – Every Single Day
 Tiesto – Bleckentrommel
 Hoxton Whores, MelleeFresh – Let's Get Dirty 
 Nu Soul Family – This Is for My People
 Go Back to the Zoo – Hey DJ 
 Kato – Celebrate Life
 Laurent Simeca – On Fire 
 Freestylers – Cracks
 Steve Edwards, Louis Botella and Joe Smooth – Promised Land
 Flo Rida – Good Feeling 
 Natalia Kills featuring Will.I.am – Free
 Josh The Funky 1 – Love The World
 Tuccillo and Patty Pravo – La Bambola
 Irad Brant – We Must Go On
 Housequake – Give A Little Love
 Dark Matters featuring Jessie Morgan – Miracles 
 Franky Rizardo – Flute Test 
 Carlos Silva featuring Nelson Freitas and Eddy Parker – Mystery 
 DJ Raymundo – Come On 
 Melvin Reese – All Day All Night 
 Graffiti6 – Stare in to The Sun 
 Nicky Romero – Growl
 Soltrenz Soundstage, Kelvin Scott – Jump All Night
 NSF – It's Whatever You Want
 Melleefresh vs. Deadmau5 – BRH
 Melvin Reese featuring Sunnery James and Ryan Marciano – Lift U Up
 Mayra Veronica – Mama Mia
 Irina – One Last Kiss
 Leah Labelle – Lolita
 Vox Halo featuring LaDolla – Criminal
 Asher Monroe – Here With You
 Danny Avila – Breaking Your Fall
 Dimitri Vangelis and Wyman featuring Jonny Rose – Pieces of Light

Websites 
 Official website

References

Dutch DJs
Electro house musicians
Dutch musical duos
Dutch dance music groups
Dutch artists
Progressive house musicians
Revealed Recordings artists
Electronic dance music DJs